George R. Parker (19 November 1897 – 18 June 1974) was an Australian athlete who competed mainly in racewalking. He competed for Australia in the 1920 Summer Olympics held in Antwerp, Belgium in the 3000 metre walk where he won the silver medal.

References

External links
 George Parker at Australian Athletics Historical Results
 
 

1897 births
1974 deaths
Australian male racewalkers
Olympic silver medalists for Australia
Athletes (track and field) at the 1920 Summer Olympics
Olympic athletes of Australia
Medalists at the 1920 Summer Olympics
Olympic silver medalists in athletics (track and field)